Héctor Miguel Herrera López (born 19 April 1990) is a Mexican professional footballer who plays as a midfielder for Major League Soccer club Houston Dynamo and the Mexico national team.

Herrera began his career with Pachuca in 2011 and spent three years at the club before joining FC Porto. He struggled for playing time in his first season in Portugal before gradually cementing his place in the starting eleven. Since the 2015–16 season, Herrera served as club captain. In his six years with Porto, Herrera made 245 appearances across all competitions, winning a Primeira Liga title and two Supertaça cups.

A full international since 2012, Herrera won the Olympic gold medal in that year's football tournament, and was part of Mexico's winning team at the 2015 CONCACAF Gold Cup. He has represented his country at the 2014 and 2018 FIFA World Cup, the 2013 and 2017 FIFA Confederations Cup, and the Copa América Centenario.

Club career

Pachuca
Herrera began playing football for C.F. Pachuca's youth sides. As a youth, he was nicknamed Zorrillo (skunk), as well as Zorro (fox).

Herrera made his professional debut for Pachuca on 21 July 2010 in a 0–1 defeat to Major Soccer League side Chivas USA in a 2010 North American SuperLiga match. Herrera made his league debut for Pachuca in a 1–4 home defeat to Santos Laguna on 23 July 2011. Appearing 14 times for Pachuca in the 2011 Apertura, he was a shortlist candidate for best rookie of the tournament.

Porto
On 28 June 2013, it was announced that Herrera was transferred to Portuguese club Porto for €8 million.

Herrera appeared as an unused substitute in his first season's opening Super Cup match against Vitória de Guimarães on 10 August, ultimately winning 3–0. Eight days later, Herrera made his Primeira Liga debut, coming on as a substitute for Lucho González in the 82nd minute in Porto's 3–1 victory over Vitória de Setúbal. On 6 October, Herrera played his first 90 minutes in Porto's 3–1 away win over Arouca. On 18 September, Herrera made his UEFA Champions League debut against Austria Wien in a 1–0 group stage victory. On 22 October, Herrera set a new UEFA Champions League record for the fastest dismissal for two yellow cards when he was sent off in the sixth minute of the group stage match against Zenit Saint Petersburg. Herrera scored his first league goal with Porto on 20 December in a 4–0 win against Olhanense, scoring on a volley just eight minutes after coming on as a substitute. In his first season with Porto, Herrera played in 17 league matches, and in 33 across all competitions, scoring three goals in total, all of which were scored in the league.

On 20 August 2014, Herrera scored his first goal in Champions League play in Porto's 1–0 win over Lille. On 25 November, he played an important role in Porto's 3–0 Champions League away win over Belarusian club BATE Borisov, scoring the first goal of the game and providing two assists, all in the second-half. Herrera was included in The Guardians year end list of "The 100 Best Footballers in the World".

On 22 August 2015, Herrera scored his first goal of the season in Porto's 1–1 draw against Marítimo at the Estádio dos Barreiros. In December, Herrera was given the Dragão de Ouro Award as the team's best player of the previous season, the first Mexican to win the honour. On 12 February 2016, Herrera, wearing the captain's arm-band, scored the equalizer in Porto's 2–1 win over archrivals Benfica. Herrera was called up for the final of the Taça de Portugal against Braga on 22 May 2016, playing in the 120 minutes of the match and failing to convert his penalty shot in the subsequent 3–2 shoot-out defeat.

On 15 April 2018, Porto defeated Benfica 1–0 at the Estádio da Luz, with Herrera scoring in the 90th minute from a shot outside the box. The win took Porto to the top of the table with 76 points, two ahead of Benfica with four matches remaining in the season. His goal was ultimately voted as the season's best. On 5 May, after a 0–0 draw between Benfica and Sporting CP, Porto won the league title with two games left to play. Herrera featured in the season's Team of the Year, one of five Porto players included.

On 4 August 2018, Herrera began the 2018–19 season captaining Porto in their 3–1 win over Aves to clinch the Supertaça Cândido de Oliveira. On 22 September, Herrera made his 200th appearance for Porto in all competitions following a 2–0 victory over Vitória Setúbal. In March 2019, he captained Porto in their 4–3 aggregate victory over Roma in the Champions League round of 16, with Porto reaching the quarter-finals for the first time since the 2014–15 competition. On 30 March, Herrera, in captaining Porto to a 3–2 victory against Braga, made his 237th appearance in all competitions for the Dragões, placing him fifth in the club's all-time list of appearances by a foreign player, four games behind Lucho González.

Amid reports linking him to Atlético Madrid, Porto president Pinto da Costa confirmed Herrera would leave the club on the expiration of his contract. On 18 May, Herrera scored in his final Primeira Liga game with Porto in the team's 2–1 victory over Sporting CP, scoring a scissor kick from a corner kick. He was again included in the season's Team of the Year.

Atlético Madrid
On 3 July 2019, Atlético Madrid announced via their website that they had reached an agreement with Herrera. He signed a three-year contract, and was officially presented at the Wanda Metropolitano with the number 16 shirt. After failing to appear for Los Rojiblancos in the first month of the season, he made his competitive debut on 18 September, coming on as a late substitute for Thomas Partey and scoring the equalizer in the 90th minute to salvage a 2–2 draw against Juventus in the opening group game of the UEFA Champions League. Three days later, Herrera made his debut in La Liga as a starter against Celta de Vigo, playing 60 minutes in a scoreless draw. He was a starter in both Supercopa de España matches against Barcelona and Real Madrid, finishing runner-up against the latter in the final. He made 30 appearances across all competitions in his debut season with Atlético, though his playing time was mostly hampered due to injuries.

At the start of the 2020–21 season Herrera was on a positive run of form, featuring eight times in all competitions and starting in the team's last four games prior to the international break, before being ruled out of action in November. It was reported that he had suffered a grade two injury to his left thigh while on international duty with Mexico, and would be out of action for a month. On his return on 1 December, Herrera, with 47, surpassed Javier Hernández as the Mexican with most UEFA Champions League appearances, coming on as a substitute in a 1–1 group stage draw against Bayern Munich. He again faced a spell on the sidelines, both due to injury and testing positive for COVID-19 in February.

In December 2021, Herrera tested positive for COVID-19 a second time.

Houston Dynamo 
On 2 March 2022, Major League Soccer club Houston Dynamo announced that it had signed Herrera on a pre-contract agreement through the 2024 season with an option for 2025. He committed to the club as a Designated Player.

International career

Youth
In 2012, Herrera was chosen by coach Luis Fernando Tena to participate in the 2012 CONCACAF Olympic Qualifying Tournament held in the United States. Mexico went on to win the tournament by defeating Honduras in the final, thus qualifying to the 2012 Olympic Games held in London.

Herrera was a vital part in the Mexico squad that won the 2012 Toulon Tournament, and was awarded the Meilleur Joueur (Best Player), the most outstanding player of the tournament.

Herrera made the final cut for those participating in the 2012 Summer Olympics. Mexico won the gold medal after defeating Brazil 2–1 in the final.

Senior

In 2012, Herrera was called up by coach José Manuel de la Torre to play for Mexico in the World Cup qualifiers against Guyana on 12 October and El Salvador on 16 October. He made his senior national team debut against El Salvador, a 2–0 win for Mexico.

On 7 June 2013, Herrera was called up to participate in the 2013 FIFA Confederations Cup. He made only one appearance, in a 0–2 loss to host-nation Brazil, coming on as a substitute for Gerardo Flores in the 58th minute of the match.

On 8 May 2014, Herrera was included in the final 23-man roster participating in the 2014 FIFA World Cup by Miguel Herrera. He was a starter in all three of Mexico's group stage matches, as well as playing in the 1–2 round-of-16 loss to the Netherlands. On 4 September 2015, Herrera netted his first goal with Mexico in a friendly against Trinidad and Tobago, scoring off of a corner kick pass from outside of the box, tying the match 3–3. Four days later, he scored his second goal in a 2–2 draw against Argentina.

Herrera was included in the roster for the 2015 CONCACAF Gold Cup. Despite a dip in form following a superb season with Porto, he appeared in all games except the final against Jamaica as Mexico won 3–1. He was called up by interim manager Ricardo Ferretti to participate in the subsequent CONCACAF Cup – a play-off match to determine CONCACAF's entry into the 2017 FIFA Confederations Cup – against the United States. Mexico won the match 3–2 during overtime.

On 17 May 2016, Herrera was listed on the roster for the Copa América Centenario by Juan Carlos Osorio. On 5 June, in Mexico's first group stage match against Uruguay, Herrera scored the third goal in the 3–1 victory.

On 8 June 2017, he was listed on the roster for the 2017 FIFA Confederations Cup. He would go on to appear in all five matches as Mexico lost the third place play-off against Portugal with a score of 2–1. With three assists, Herrera finished as the assist leader of the tournament.

On 28 May 2018, Herrera captained the national team in a scoreless draw to Wales in preparation for the World Cup.
On 4 June, Herrera was included in the final 23-man squad for the tournament. In the first group stage match against Germany, which Mexico won 1–0, Herrera's performance was praised in particular. He would appear as a starter in all three group stage matches and the round-of-16 match against Brazil, where Mexico lost 2–0.

In May 2019, Herrera issued a statement via Twitter confirming that he would not form part of the national squad participating at the CONCACAF Gold Cup, citing fitness concerns as well as wanting to decide his "professional future" as his contract with Porto was expiring. Under Gerardo Martino, he reappeared with Mexico in the friendly match against the United States on 6 September, and played all 90 minutes in El Tris 3–0 victory. The following month, Herrera captained Mexico in the CONCACAF Nations League fixtures against Bermuda and Panama, scoring off of a free kick layoff in a 5–1 victory against the former.

In June 2021, Herrera participated in the Concacaf Nations League Finals, reaching the final against the United States, losing 2–3. He was included in the Best XI of the tournament. He participated in the subsequent CONCACAF Gold Cup, appearing as captain in the first two group stage matches due to Héctor Moreno being unfit. Losing the final to the United States 0–1, he was awarded the Golden Ball for best player of the tournament.

On 5 June 2022, he played his 100th match for Mexico in a friendly game against Ecuador.

In October 2022, Herrera was named in Mexico's preliminary 31-man squad for the 2022 FIFA World Cup, and in November, he was ultimately included in the final 26-man roster.

Style of play

Herrera is described as a box-to-box midfielder, capable of halting opposing advances and able to distribute the ball or shoot the ball on target. He is also known for his pace and dynamism, as well as being capable of breaking up opposition attacks with his tough tackling and starting his team's own forays forward with his sharp distribution and tireless running.

Herrera has cited Juan Román Riquelme as an idol and an influence on his playing style.

Personal life
In June 2019, Herrera obtained an EU passport after residing in Portugal for six years.

Career statistics
Club

International

Scores and results list Mexico's goal tally first, score column indicates score after each Herrera goal.

HonoursPortoPrimeira Liga: 2017–18
Supertaça Cândido de Oliveira: 2013, 2018Atlético MadridLa Liga: 2020–21Mexico U23Olympic Gold Medal: 2012
CONCACAF Olympic Qualifying Championship: 2012
Toulon Tournament: 2012MexicoCONCACAF Gold Cup: 2015
CONCACAF Cup: 2015Individual'
Toulon Tournament Best Player: 2012
FC Porto Player of the Year: 2014–15
FIFA Confederations Cup Assist Leader: 2017
Primeira Liga Team of the Year: 2017–18, 2018–19
SPJF Goal of the season: 2017–18
CONCACAF Best XI: 2017, 2018, 2021
IFFHS CONCACAF Best XI: 2020
CONCACAF Nations League Finals Best XI: 2021
CONCACAF Gold Cup Golden Ball: 2021
CONCACAF Gold Cup Best XI: 2021

References

External links

 
 
 
 
 
 
 Héctor Herrera at Goal.com 

1990 births
Living people
People from Rosarito
Sportspeople from Tijuana
Footballers from Baja California
Mexican footballers
Association football midfielders
C.F. Pachuca players
FC Porto players
FC Porto B players
Atlético Madrid footballers
Liga MX players
Primeira Liga players
Liga Portugal 2 players
La Liga players
Olympic footballers of Mexico
Mexico international footballers
Footballers at the 2012 Summer Olympics
2013 FIFA Confederations Cup players
2014 FIFA World Cup players
2015 CONCACAF Gold Cup players
Copa América Centenario players
2017 FIFA Confederations Cup players
2018 FIFA World Cup players
2021 CONCACAF Gold Cup players
Medalists at the 2012 Summer Olympics
Olympic gold medalists for Mexico
Olympic medalists in football
CONCACAF Gold Cup-winning players
Mexican expatriate footballers
Mexican expatriate sportspeople in Spain
Expatriate footballers in Portugal
Expatriate footballers in Spain
Naturalised citizens of Portugal
FIFA Century Club
Designated Players (MLS)
Major League Soccer players
2022 FIFA World Cup players